The 2022 Massachusetts general election was held on November 8, 2022, throughout Massachusetts. Primary elections were held on September 6, 2022.

The election includes:

 Federal elections for the US House of Representatives
 Statewide elections for Governor, Lieutenant Governor, Attorney General, Secretary of the Commonwealth, Treasurer, and Auditor;
 District elections for State Representatives, State Senators, and Governor's Councillors;
 County elections for Sheriff, District Attorney, County Commissioner (only in certain counties)
 Ballot questions at the state and local levels.

To register to vote, Massachusetts residents had to register by October 29, 2022.

To vote by mail, registered Massachusetts voters had to request a ballot by November 1, 2022.

Federal offices

U.S. House of Representatives 
All of Massachusetts' nine seats in the United States House of Representatives were up for election in 2022.

All nine seats were won by the incumbent Democratic Party candidates.

State legislature 
All seats in the State legislature, the General Court, will be up for election.

Massachusetts State Senate 

All 40 seats in the Massachusetts Senate were up for election in 2022.

In the general election, the Democratic Party captured 37 seats (an increase of 1 seat) while the Republican Party captured three seats (no change in seat number).

Massachusetts State House of Representatives 

All 160 seats in the Massachusetts House of Representatives were up for election in 2022.

 
Massachusetts